The 60th Annual Miss Universe Puerto Rico pageant was held at the Centro Ferial Juan H. Cintrón in Ponce, Puerto Rico, on October 9, 2014.
Gabriela Berrios, who won the title of Miss Universe Puerto Rico 2014, crowned her successor at end of the event, Catalina Morales of Guaynabo, who represented Puerto Rico at Miss Universe 2015.

Results

Placements

Gala de Premios (Special Awards Gala)
The Special Awarda Gala took place on October 1, 2014 and the following awards were given:

Also, the Hotel Melia in Ponce, chose six contestants that will be the official image of the hotel of their new publicity. The chosen contestants were: Miss Cayey (Nicole Colon), Miss Guaynabo (Catalina Morales), Miss Humacao (Stephanie Cruz), Miss Aguas Buenas (Nivializ Perez), Miss Mayaguez (Alina Roman), and Miss Ponce (Frances Cintron).

These awards will be given during the pageant on October 9:

Best National Costume
The Top 10 for Best National Costume were announced on September 8, 2014 during the Trajes de Tipico (Best National Costume) event. The winner and runners-up were announced during the pageant on October 9, 2014.

Contestants
Here is a list of the official 45 contestants:

See also

 Miss Puerto Rico

Notes
 The pageant originally consisted of 51 contestants but Miss Sabana Grande (Perla Aquino), Miss Guayama (Hilda Rivera), Miss Carolina (Ashley Ruiz), Miss Hatillo (Tania Soto), Miss Quebradillas (Keysi Marie Vargas), and Miss San Juan (Heilymar Rosario) withdrew for various reasons, dropping the number of contestants to 45.
 Miss Carolina, Ashley Ruiz, previously competed at Miss Universe Puerto Rico 2010 representing Rincón where she finished in Top 10. She also competed at Miss International Puerto Rico 2012 where she won the title.
 Miss Cayey, Nicole Colón, previously competed at Miss Pan American International 2012 where she won the title.
 Miss Gurabo, Giovanna López, previously competed at Miss Universe Puerto Rico 2011 representing San Lorenzo but failed to place in semi-finals.
 Miss Lajas, Itzaira Vélez, previously competed at Miss Universe Puerto Rico 2011 representing Lajas but failed to place in semi-finals.
 Miss Lares, Melanie Rivera Ruíz, previously competed at Miss Puerto Rico Teen 2010 where she won the title.
 Miss Quebradillas, Keysi Marie Vargas, withdrew from the competition after being appointed to represent Puerto Rico in Miss Intercontinental 2014 in Germany.
 Miss San Juan, Heilymar Rosario, withdrew from the competition due to medical reasons after developing severe pneumonia being hospitalized for almost three weeks. She would later compete the following year at Miss Universe Puerto Rico 2016 where she finished as 2nd Runner-Up. Additionally she represented Puerto Rico at Miss Intercontinental 2016 where she won the title. She later competed at Miss Universe Puerto Rico 2021 representing Toa Baja where she finished in the Top 5.

Historical significance
 Guaynabo won Miss Universe Puerto Rico for the fifth time, the last time was Zoribel Fonalledas in 2000.
 The following municipalities also made the semi-finals last year were Añasco, Arecibo, Bayamón, Camuy, Cayey, and Dorado.
 Cayey placed for the fourth consecutive year as well as the Top 5 for the third consecutive year.
 Coamo and San Germán last placed in 2007.
 Caguas and Salinas last placed in 2009.
 Las Marías and Utuado last placed in 2010.
 Guaynabo  and Ponce last placed in 2011.
 Adjuntas, Aguas Buenas, Humacao, Lares, Las Píedras, and Mayagüez last placed in 2013.

References

2014 in Puerto Rico
Puerto Rico 2015
Universe Puerto Rico